Triplophysa stewarti is a species of stone loach in the genus Triplophysa. It lives in slow-flowing rivers and lakes among rocks and vegetation; it is found in numerous lakes and in upper Salween, Indus, and Brahmaputra drainages in Tibet as well as in Kashmir, India. It grows to  SL.

References

S
Freshwater fish of China
Freshwater fish of India
Fauna of Tibet
Taxa named by Sunder Lal Hora
Fish described in 1922